Sepp Dostthaler (born 9 January 1965) is a German former bobsledder who competed in the mid-1990s. He is best known for his third-place finish in the 1995-6 Bobsleigh World Cup championships in the two-man event.

Dostthaler also finished 12th in the two-man event at the 1994 Winter Olympics in Lillehammer.

References

External links
1994 bobsleigh two-man results
List of two-man bobsleigh World Cup champions since 1985

Bobsledders at the 1994 Winter Olympics
German male bobsledders
Living people
1965 births
Place of birth missing (living people)
Olympic bobsledders of Germany